Private first class is a military rank held by junior enlisted personnel in many armed forces.

French speaking countries
In France and other French speaking countries, the rank  is used.

Poland
In Poland, the rank is called .

Singapore 

Introduced in 1983, the honorific rank is awarded to hardworking conscript citizen-soldiers who performed well in their National Service term. Private First Class (PFC) wear a rank insignia of a single chevron pointing down.
 
The Private First Class (PFC) rank is rarely awarded nowadays by the Singapore Armed Forces. All private enlistees can be promoted directly to Lance Corporal (LCP) should they meet the minimum qualifying requirements, conduct appraisal and work performance.

United States

United States Army

In the United States Army, recruits usually enter service as a private in pay grade E-1. Private (E-2), designated by a single chevron, is typically an automatic promotion after six months of service. Private first class (E-3), equivalent to NATO grade OR-3, is designated by a single chevron with one arc or "rocker," and is more common among soldiers who have served in the U.S. Army for one year or more. Soldiers who have achieved an associate degree or its equivalent are entitled to enter the Army at this pay grade. Advancement from private first class is to specialist (E-4); advancement to corporal (also at the E-4 pay grade) requires that the soldier also complete the Basic Leader Course (BLC), the first course of study in a US Army noncommissioned officer's professional development course. Thus, in order to qualify for leadership posts such as team leader, the soldier must have first served as a corporal; a team leader is nominally a sergeant (E-5).

The rank of private first class has existed since 1846 and, prior to 1919, its insignia consisted of the branch of service insignia without any arcs or chevrons. The Secretary of War approved "an arc of one bar" (i.e., a "rocker") under the branch of service or trade insignia for privates first class on 22 July 1919. From August 5, 1920, to May 28, 1968, the rank insignia for private first class was a single chevron, per War Department Circular No. 303. On May 28, 1968, the insignia was changed to its current form, consisting of a single chevron with one arc.

United States Marine Corps

In the United States Marine Corps, the rank of private first class is the second lowest, just under lance corporal and just above Private, equivalent to NATO grade OR-2, being pay grade E-2. It was established on June 3, 1916, to match the already existing Army rank, primarily because US Marine units were "often called upon to serve" with US Army organizations, such as in the American Expeditionary Force that served in Europe during World War I (e.g. 4th Marine Brigade of the U.S. Army's 2nd Infantry Division). At the time the two ranks were directly equivalent. However, the USMC rank of PFC is one grade lower (E-2) than the similarly titled US Army rank.

Gallery

See also

 Comparative military ranks
 Gefreiter
 U.S. Army enlisted rank insignia
 U.S. Marine Corps enlisted rank insignia
 U.S. uniformed services pay grades
 United States military pay

References

Military ranks of Singapore
Military ranks of the United States Army
Military ranks of the United States Marine Corps
United States military enlisted ranks